USS Tulsa (LCS-16) is an  of the United States Navy. She is the third ship to be named for Tulsa, second-largest city in the U.S. state of Oklahoma.

Design
In 2002, the United States Navy initiated a program to develop the first of a fleet of littoral combat ships. The Navy initially ordered two trimaran hulled ships from General Dynamics, which became known as the  after the first ship of the class, . Even-numbered U.S. Navy littoral combat ships are built using the Independence-class trimaran design, while odd-numbered ships are based on a competing design, the conventional monohull . The initial order of littoral combat ships involved a total of four ships, including two of the Independence-class design. On 29 December 2010, the Navy announced that it was awarding Austal USA a contract to build ten additional Independence-class littoral combat ships.

Construction and career 
Tulsa was constructed by Austal USA in Mobile, Alabama. A keel laying ceremony, which usually signifies the startìng of ship construction, was held at the Austal shipyards in Mobile on 11 January 2016, but because the ship was assembled from prefabricated modules, Tulsa was already 60 percent complete at the time. Kathy Taylor, former mayor of Tulsa, served as ship's sponsor.

Tulsa was christened on 11 February 2017, launched on 16 March 2017, and commissioned on 16 February 2019. She has been assigned to Littoral Combat Ship Squadron One

Tulsa returned to San Diego on 30 July 2022 following deployment.

References

External links

 

Independence-class littoral combat ships
2017 ships